The Princess Diaries 2: Royal Engagement is a 2004 American romantic comedy film and the sequel to 2001's The Princess Diaries. Unlike the first film, this film is not based on any of the books.

Most of the cast returned from the first film, including Julie Andrews, Anne Hathaway, Héctor Elizondo, Heather Matarazzo, and Larry Miller. Garry Marshall returned to direct and Debra Martin Chase and Whitney Houston to produce. New characters include Viscount Mabrey (John Rhys-Davies), Lord Nicholas Devereaux (Chris Pine, his film debut), and Andrew Jacoby (Callum Blue).

Despite having a worldwide box office gross of $134.7 million, the film received mixed to negative reviews from critics. A sequel is currently in development.

Plot

Five years after the first film, Mia Thermopolis graduates from Woodrow Wilson School of International Affairs at Princeton University, returning to Genovia. There, she awaits her grandmother, Queen Clarisse's, abdication. Dancing with all eligible bachelors at her 21st birthday party to find a husband, she meets a dashing young gentleman named Nicholas, and the two become mutually attracted. During the evening, Mia's tiara falls off, caught by Member of Parliament (MP), Viscount Mabrey, who secretly plans to steal the crown.

During the Parliamentary session the next morning, Mia hears Mabrey revealing his nephew, Lord Devereaux, to be the next male heir to the throne. By law, Mia can only be Queen if she marries within the month. Clarisse invites Lord Devereaux to stay at the palace, and Mia is shocked to discover he is Nicholas. Her best friend, Lilly Moscovitz, surprises her with a visit. Together, they look through potential husbands. Mia eventually chooses Andrew Jacoby, Duke of Kenilworth, and days later, they are engaged. Mabrey plans to have Nicholas seduce Mia so the engagement will fail. Joe tries to persuade Clarisse to publicly pursue their feelings for each other as her reign as queen is coming to an end.

Mia has to ride sidesaddle for a ceremony but is inexperienced, so Queen Clarisse provides an ancestral wooden leg decoy so it seems she's doing so. When Mabrey spooks Mia's horse with a rubber snake, Joe inadvertently tears off the wooden leg. Humiliated, she flees to the stables, where Nicholas fails to comfort her. At a garden party, Mia and Nicholas quarrel about her relationship with Andrew. As they argue, he kisses her. At first, she kisses him back but then backs away. Pursuing her, they fall into a fountain. Queen Clarisse tells Mia that her behavior with Nicholas has to stop.

At the Genovian Independence Day parade, seeing some boys harassing a little girl, Mia abruptly halts the parade to help. Learning the girl, Carolina, and the others are orphans, she has a vendor give them all tiaras and lets them walk with them in the parade. Everyone is impressed, while Mabrey sees it as a political maneuver. Nicholas is also struck by Mia's care for Genovia and begins doubting taking over the throne. Mia later declares the conversion of a royal palace into a temporary children's center.

At Mia's bachelorette slumber party, princesses attend from around the world. They mattress surf and sing karaoke. Meanwhile, Nicholas tries to stop his uncle from pursuing the throne as Mia is doing well as a ruler. Mabrey realizes Nicholas has fallen for her, but believes Mia will never love him. Mabrey encourages him to pursue her, later revealing to his surly and mistreated housekeeper Gretchen he plans to let this ruin Mia's chances of becoming queen. Manipulating Nicholas, he makes him believe it was his late father's wish for him to become king. Nicholas helps Mia succeed at hitting the target as she is practicing for her coronation rites. He tells her he is leaving, but asks to see her once more before he goes. She declines, as she is under close guard.

That night, Nicholas convinces Mia outside her window, to sneak out. By a lake, they share secrets, dance, and eventually fall asleep. They awaken to find a man filming them. Mia thinks Nicholas set her up, while he insists he had no idea. The scandalous footage is already being broadcast before she returns. Disappointed, Andrew kisses Mia to see if there is a romantic spark between them. There isn't, but they do not call off the wedding for the good of Genovia. The wedding is the following day, and Mia's mother, Helen, comes with her new husband Patrick O'Connell and their newborn son named Trevor. Nicholas decides against attending, until Gretchen tells him Mabrey engineered the televised scandal.

Before the wedding, Joe tells Mia that Nicholas is innocent. Walking down the aisle, she suddenly stops and runs out of the church. Queen Clarisse follows and Mia says she doesn't want to be forced to marry. Clarisse encourages her to follow her heart, something she never did, costing her Joe, the love of her life. Returning into the church, Mia points out to everyone that her unmarried grandmother has ruled Genovia for many years, asking the members of parliament to reconsider the law, asking them if they would force the significant women in their lives to marry without love. Mabrey again suggests his nephew be named King instead, but Nicholas appears, refusing the crown. Mia proposes the law on royal marriages be abolished, and the Parliament unanimously assents. Clarisse proposes to Joe and they are promptly married.

A week later, Mia is preparing for her coronation when Nicholas arrives. Professing his love on bended knee, they kiss. The next day, Queen Clarisse steps down, and Mia is crowned "Her Majesty Amelia Mignonette Thermopolis Renaldi, Queen of Genovia", with all in attendance in the palace.

An epilogue shows the Genovian Parliament now allows female members, one of whom is Charlotte (Clarisse's lady-in-waiting). In a final scene, Queen Mia officially opens a new children's home with Carolina.

Cast
Anne Hathaway as Mia Thermopolis
Julie Andrews as Queen Clarisse Renaldi
Héctor Elizondo as Joe
John Rhys-Davies as Viscount Mabrey
Heather Matarazzo as Lilly Moscovitz
Chris Pine as Nicholas Deveraux
Callum Blue as Andrew Jacoby
Caroline Goodall as Helen Thermopolis O'Connell
Meredith Patterson as Lady Elissa
Kathleen Marshall as Charlotte Kutaway
Joel McCrary as Prime Minister Motaz
Kim Thomson as Elsie Kentworthy
Tom Poston as Lord Palimore 
Raven-Symoné as Princess Asana
Larry Miller as Paolo Puttanesca
Matthew Walker as Captain Kip Kelly
Shea Curry as Brigitte
Anna A. White as Brigitta
Cassie Rowell as Olivia
Erik Bragg as Lionel
Sean O'Bryan as Patrick O'Connell
Scott Marshall as Shades
Abigail Breslin as Carolina
Stan Lee in a cameo appearance
Jonny Blu as himself
Spencer Breslin as Prince Jacques
Tracy Reiner as Lady Anthony
Paul C. Vogt as Lord Crawley
Paul Williams as Lord Harmony
Anna Netrebko as herself
Hannah Schneider as Princess Hannah
Jane Morris as Gretchen
Charlee Corra Disney as Princess Charlee
Aimee Adams Hall as Princess Aimee
Nadège August as Princess Nadege
Claudia Katz Minnick as Freda Kout

Reception
The film opened in 3,472 theaters in North America and grossed $23 million in its opening weekend. It grossed $134.7 million worldwide—$95.2 million in North America and $39.6 million in other territories.

Critical response
Review aggregator Rotten Tomatoes reports that 26% of 120 critic reviews are "fresh" (positive), and the average rating is 4.57/10. The site's critical consensus is that "Anne Hathaway and Julie Andrews bring charm and elegance to the movie, but there's not enough material for them to work with in this sequel." At Metacritic, the film has an average score of 43/100 from the 31 reviews, which indicates "mixed or average reviews".

The film's writer, Shonda Rhimes, later said that she treasured the experience if for nothing else – the opportunity to work with its star, Julie Andrews. Andrews was later cast as the voice of Lady Whistledown in Rhimes' 2020 series, Bridgerton.

Soundtrack

The song, "Your Crowning Glory", a duet between Queen Clarisse (Julie Andrews) and Princess Asana (Raven-Symoné) was the first time Andrews had sung in public or on screen since she had throat surgery in 1997.

Sequel
In March 2016, Garry Marshall announced plans for a third Princess Diaries film, with  Hathaway reprising her role. When Marshall died in July 2016, the project had been shelved indefinitely. In August of the same year, Hector Elizondo discussed development of the third installment stating, "I know Anne would like to do it. I know Julie would like to do it. I would like to do it. So we're on board, it's a question of when and a question of getting a good story. I'm ready! It's time to go back to Genovia!"

In May 2018, Anne Hathaway stated that she would still like to appear in a third Princess Diaries film. By January 2019, she confirmed that a script is completed and that she and Andrews are currently on board to co-star in the film and producer Debra Martin Chase will return. She further stated that the film will not enter production until "it's perfect".

On November 15, 2022, it was revealed that Disney was moving forward with a third Princess Diaries film. Though she is not confirmed to appear, the company is reportedly interested in bringing Hathaway back.

References

External links
 
 
 
 
 
 
 

The Princess Diaries
2004 films
2004 romantic comedy films
American romantic comedy films
American sequel films
2000s English-language films
Films about princesses
Films about weddings
Films directed by Garry Marshall
Films scored by John Debney
Films set in Europe
Films set in palaces
Films set in a fictional country
Films shot in Los Angeles
Films shot in Wiltshire
Walt Disney Pictures films
2000s American films